Patrick ("Pat") Ralph Porter (May 31, 1959 – July 26, 2012) was an American distance runner. Born in Wadena, Minnesota, he  graduated from Adams State in 1982 with a degree in marketing, after which he became one of the most dominant U.S. distance runners of the 1980s. Porter was a two time U.S. Olympian, running the 10000 meters at the 1984 and 1988 Olympic Games.  In 1983 he set the World Record for a road 10K at 27:31.8.  He won the silver medal at the 1985 IAAF World Cup in Canberra, Australia, getting nipped at the tape by Ethiopia's Wodajo Bulti by six hundredths of a second.

Running career

Early career
Porter had a personal record of 4:29 in the mile while running for Evergreen High School in Evergreen, Colorado. He was not heavily recruited to run in college. He is a 1982 alumnus Adams State College in Alamosa, Colorado, and flourished under the training of coach Joe Vigil. At Adams State, Porter won 6 RMAC championships, and 3 national NAIA championships.

Post collegiate
Porter was best known for his cross country running accomplishments.  He won a record eight consecutive USA Cross Country Championships from 1982 to 1989.  Porter also represented the United States at the World Cross Country Championships each of these years.  His best finish at the World Championships was 4th in 1984, followed by 6th, 7th, 9th and 10th-place finishes throughout his career.

1984
Porter finished 15th in 28:34.59 at the Athletics at the 1984 Summer Olympics - 10000 metres.

1988
Porter did not advance to the Athletics at the 1988 Summer Olympics - 10000 metres final after finishing 11th in 28:45.04 in the 1st round, ranking him 23rd in the Olympics that year, but only 20 qualified to the final.  His time would have ranked 17th as several runners ran slower in the final, still almost 1:25 (almost a lap and a half) behind the winner.

In 1998 Porter played Finnish distance runner Lasse Virén in Without Limits, a biographical film about American distance legend Steve Prefontaine.  He was married to fellow U.S. 1988 Olympic Team member high jumper Trish King.

Honor
Porter was inducted in the National Association of Intercollegiate Athletics Hall of Fame in 1987. Porter was inducted in the RMAC Hall of Fame in July 2012. Only days before his death, on July 20, Porter had been inducted into the Rocky Mountain Athletic Conference Hall of Fame in Colorado Springs and was also inducted into the Adams State Athletics Hall of Fame in 2000 in Alamosa, Colorado.

Death
On July 26, 2012, at approximately 8:30 a.m., Porter was killed in an airplane crash along with his 15-year-old son Connor and his son's friend, 14-year-old Connor Mantsch. Porter, an avid pilot, on takeoff hit a boundary fence at the south end of the Sedona Airport runway just outside Sedona, Arizona, then went down a steep mesa and burst into flames upon impact at the bottom of the hill.  He was 53 years old.

Competition record

Cross country

Track and field

References

External links

1959 births
2012 deaths
People from Wadena, Minnesota
American male long-distance runners
Athletes (track and field) at the 1984 Summer Olympics
Athletes (track and field) at the 1988 Summer Olympics
Olympic track and field athletes of the United States
Aviators killed in aviation accidents or incidents in the United States
Universiade medalists in athletics (track and field)
Universiade bronze medalists for the United States
Medalists at the 1987 Summer Universiade
Victims of aviation accidents or incidents in 2012